Selwyn Range can refer to:

 Selwyn Range (Australia), rugged highlands in north-west Queensland, Australia
 Selwyn Range (Canada), a mountain range in British Columbia
 Selwyn Range is also used to refer to the Selwyn Mountains in Yukon and the Northwest Territories, Canada

See also
 Mount Selwyn (mountain), a mountain in the Victorian Alps, Victoria, Australia
 Selwyn Snowfields, a ski resort in the Snowy Mountains, New South Wales, Australia